Amit Kumar (born 25 November 1989) is an Indian cricketer. He made his first-class debut for Himachal Pradesh in the 2011–12 Ranji Trophy on 29 November 2011.

References

External links
 

1989 births
Living people
Indian cricketers
Himachal Pradesh cricketers
Place of birth missing (living people)